The Hampton Lillibridge House is a historic home in Savannah, Georgia, United States. It is located at 507 East St. Julian Street, in the southwestern civic/trust lot of Washington Square, and was built around 1797. One of the oldest extant buildings in Savannah, it is now part of the Savannah Historic District. In a survey for the Historic Savannah Foundation, Mary Lane Morrison found the building, constructed by Rhode Island native Hampton Lillibridge, to be of significant status.

Lillibridge died at Shandy Hall, near Savannah, on February 14, 1801, after contracting yellow fever. His widowed second wife, Anna Orford, sold the house, at which point it became a boarding house.

It is one of Savannah's few clapboard houses to have survived the fire of 1820.

The property was bought by James Arthur Williams in 1969. He moved it to its current location and restored it.

See also 

 Buildings in Savannah Historic District

References 

Houses in Savannah, Georgia
Houses completed in 1797
Savannah Historic District
Washington Square (Savannah) buildings